Bukreyevka is a rural locality in Lebyazhensky Selsoviet Rural Settlement, Kursky District, Kursk Oblast, Russia. Population:

Geography 
The village is located 94 km from the Russia–Ukraine border, 8 km south-east of Kursk, 8 km from the selsoviet center – Cheryomushki.

 Climate
Bukreyevka has a warm-summer humid continental climate (Dfb in the Köppen climate classification).

Transport 
Bukreyevka is located 0.3 km from the road of regional importance  (Kursk – Bolshoye Shumakovo – Polevaya via Lebyazhye), 1.5 km from the nearest railway station Konaryovo (railway line Klyukva — Belgorod).

The rural locality is situated 10 km from Kursk Vostochny Airport, 114 km from Belgorod International Airport and 201 km from Voronezh Peter the Great Airport.

References

Notes

Sources

Rural localities in Kursky District, Kursk Oblast